David Althoff is an American marine who was awarded three Distinguished Flying Cross, three Silver Stars and nearly 50 Air Medals. He also is a recipient of the Cunningham Award and a developer of SuperGaggle.

Vietnam War
On February 21, 1968, he flew CH-46 helicopters to resupply the Khe Sanh Combat Base with water and ammo. During that time his aircraft suffered numerous hits from enemy's automatic weapons and mortars. On May 13, 1968, he was in charge of reconnaissance aircraft.

References

Living people
United States Marine Corps personnel of the Vietnam War
Recipients of the Distinguished Flying Cross (United States)
Recipients of the Silver Star
Recipients of the Air Medal
Year of birth missing (living people)